Nosaby IF is a Swedish football club located in Nosaby in Kristianstad, Skåne County.

Background
Nosaby Idrottsförening was formed in 1956. Their first home ground was Vallbjörka, which was located between Balsbyvägen and the Nosaby canal and had previously been used by Araslövs IK, a club that existed between 1933 and 1954. Upon Nosaby IF's foundation they immediately planned on building a new ground. Nosaby made their debut in the Swedish league system in 1959 and moved to Nya Vallbjörka a year later. Until 1997, they had always played in the two lowest divisions organised by Skånes Fotbollförbund. From 1996 to 1999, starting at the bottom of the league system, Nosaby achieved three promotions in four seasons and qualified for Division 4, the highest of the divisions organised at district level. In 2006, they were promoted to Division 3 and thus qualified to play in the leagues organised by the Swedish Football Association for the first time. They were promoted to Division 2 in 2013 but were relegated again after two seasons. They were promoted back to Division 2 in 2017. In 2020 Nosaby defeated Kristianstad FC by 3–1 in the first ever league derby between the two clubs; the result also ensured that Nosaby would finish higher than their rivals in the league, making them the best team in the city for the first time. They went on to finish 4th in the division, securing their best league season in history.

The club has more than 500 members of which over 300 are young people who participate in the club's 15 youth teams. They play their home matches at the Nya Vallbjörka in Kristianstad. Nosaby IF are affiliated to Skånes Fotbollförbund.

Season to season 
{| 
|valign="top" width=0%|

* League restructuring in 2006 resulted in a new division being created at Tier 3 and subsequent divisions dropping a level.

Coaches

Tommy Lindgren (1997–2000)
Janne Pettersson (2001)
Alf Axelsson (2002, sacked in July)
Tommy Lindgren (2002)
Stefan "Messer" Andersson (2003–2004)
Anders Svahn (2005–2008)
Marek Skurczynski (2009–2010)
Hampus Frank (2011–2012)
Fredrik Johansson (2013–2015)
Peter Persson (2016–2018)
Christian Folin (2019)
Stefan Liljegren (2020)
Besnik Llazani (2021, resigned in September)
Matte Andersson (2021–present)

Attendances

In recent seasons Nosaby IF have had the following average attendances:

Footnotes

External links
 Nosaby IF – Official website

Football clubs in Skåne County
Association football clubs established in 1956
1956 establishments in Sweden
Sport in Kristianstad Municipality